Marcello Albani (1905–1980) was an American-born Italian screenwriter, producer and film director. He is particularly noted for his 1943 film Redemption which glorified the rise to power of the Fascist Party in the 1920s, but was disliked by the Fascist film chief Luigi Freddi who thought it was too overtly propagandistic.

Selected filmography

Director
 Boccaccio (1940)
 Redemption (1943)

Screenwriter
 White Amazons (1936)

References

Bibliography 
 Gundle, Stephen. Mussolini's Dream Factory: Film Stardom in Fascist Italy. Berghan Books, 2013.

External links 
 

1905 births
1980 deaths
20th-century Italian screenwriters
Italian film producers
Italian film directors
Writers from New York City
Italian male screenwriters
20th-century Italian male writers
American emigrants to Italy